Luktvatnet is a lake that lies in the northern part of the municipality of Vefsn in Nordland county, Norway. The European route E6 highway passes along the northern shore of the lake.

Name
The name is probably from the Southern Sami language word Loektejaevrie. This is a compound of loekti which means "inlet" and jaevrie which means "lake", thus it is "the lake with many inlets".

See also
 List of lakes in Norway
 Geography of Norway

References

Lakes of Nordland
Vefsn